Reddycherla is a village in Prakasam district of Andhra Pradesh, India.

References

Villages in Prakasam district